Yesspeak is a film chronicling the then current lineup of the progressive rock group Yes (featuring Jon Anderson, Steve Howe, Rick Wakeman, Chris Squire, and Alan White) directed by Robert Garofalo and narrated by Roger Daltrey. It was premiered in theatres across the United States on 26 January 2004, and was followed by a closed-circuit live acoustic performance by Yes in front of a small studio audience (resulting in the DVD  Yes Acoustic: Guaranteed No Hiss).

Divided into ten chapters, the programme systematically covers the background, history, and outlook of the group before an extended interview with each of the five members of the group. There are also discussions with members on the band's music and glimpses of the band's 2003 world tour.

Personnel
Jon Anderson:  vocals, guitar, percussion
Steve Howe:  guitar, vocals
Rick Wakeman:  keyboards
Chris Squire:  bass, vocals
Alan White:  drums

Yes (band) video albums
Documentary films about rock music and musicians
2004 video albums